Trevaskis is a Cornish surname. Notable people with that name include:

 John Trevaskis, Cornish rugby player
 Kennedy Trevaskis (1915–1990), British colonial official
 Liam Trevaskis (born 1999), English cricketer
 Tim Trevaskis (1902–1980), Aussie rules footballer